Social Security Protection Act of 2011 is a proposed change to the United States Constitution. The amendment is in response to the proposed changes to Social Security qualifications that are aiming to combat the rising debt ceiling. Advocates of the bill argue that Social Security has consistently succeeded in protecting millions of Americans from poverty, providing beneficiaries with substantial benefits while never contributing to federal debt or financial crisis. The Amendment was first introduced during the 112th Congress in August 2011, but no action was taken during that Congress.

The amendment

References

Social security in the United States